Mayfair Capital Investment Management is a UK real estate investment management company owned by Swiss Life Asset Managers. It was founded in 2002 and the senior Executive Directors include James Thornton as CEO and Robert Palmer as CIO. William Hill acts as Non-Executive Director, formerly Head of Property at Schroders.

The company manages a series of funds, which invest in UK commercial and residential real estate, for professional clients, charities, pension funds and institutional investors. The company has a joint venture with L&B Realty Advisors, established in 2009 as L&B Mayfair to enable cross-Atlantic investment.

Funds
Mayfair Capital manages a number of discretionary funds along with advisory and separate account mandates.

The fund's investment objectives are as follows:
 Property Income Trust for Charities (“PITCH”)
PITCH is a tax-exempt, pooled UK commercial property vehicle that is available to all UK and EU qualifying charities. With a commitment to socially responsible investment, through its formal ethical and environmental policies. The Fund aims to deliver a relatively high and sustainable income yield whilst at least maintaining capital value in real terms over the economic cycle. Income is distributed monthly. The Fund operates both ethical and environmental policies and seeks to be a socially responsible investor.

 Mayfair Capital Residential 2 ("MCR2") 
MCR2 is a residential development finance fund providing investors with investment returns from Greater London residential property.

 Property segregated / advisory mandates
MC Property Unit Trust (“MCPUT”)
MCPUT is an unregulated eligible investor Fund for investment by exempt approved pension funds, investment trusts, charities and sophisticated investors. The Fund's investment objective is to provide total returns from investment in a diversified portfolio of UK commercial property and a net distribution yield on original equity of around 5% a year. The Fund is benchmarked to the IPD/AREF ABPFI. The investment manager is Schroder Property Management (Jersey) Limited.

 Mayfair Capital Commercial Property Trust (“MCCPT”)
MCCPT is a Jersey-domiciled fund for clients invested in the Jupiter Merlin portfolios, seeking diversification away from equities and bonds for income generation. The target distribution yield is 5-5.50%.

 Mayfair Capital UK Thematic Growth Fund (“TGR”)
TGR Mayfair launched a UK Thematic Growth Fund adopting a “Thematic” investment approach, targeting returns of 8 - 10% per annum net leveraged IRR(1) (Max 35% average LTV)(2) with a stabilised coupon of +/- 5%(1).

Awards
In 2014, 2015, 2016, 2017 Mayfair Capital was highly commended and shortlisted respectively with five other firms in the Fund Manager of the Year category at the Estates Gazette Awards. In 2015, Mayfair Capital was shortlisted with six other firms for Property Fund Manager of the Year at Property Week's Annual Awards 2015. In 2014, Mayfair Capital won the Boutique Investment Management Award at the Charity Times Awards, and in 2015 was shortlisted in this same category.

References

Financial services companies established in 2002
Companies based in the City of Westminster
2002 establishments in the United Kingdom
Property management companies
Swiss Life